Izarra is a small village in the Urkabustaiz municipality in the Basque province of Álava.     

Populated places in Álava